Duman is a town in the Islamabad Capital Territory of Pakistan. It is located at 33° 16' 45N 73° 18' 40E with an altitude of 447 metres (1469 feet).

References 

Union councils of Islamabad Capital Territory